嶺南, meaning "south of the mountain pass", may refer to:
Lingnan, region of China south of the Nan Mountains, roughly corresponding to Jiangxi, Hunan, Guangdong, Guangxi, and Hainan Provinces
Yeongnam, region of Korea roughly corresponding to the historical Gyeongsang Province
Wakasa Province of Japan, alternatively called Reinan, roughly corresponding to Fukui Prefecture

See also